Giring Ganesha Djumaryo (born 14 July 1983) is an Indonesian vocalist and political activist. He is a former lead singer of the Indonesian rock band, Nidji. On 31 December 2017, he announced his resignation as Nidji's lead vocalist in order to focus on his political journey. Giring is the Chairman of Indonesian Solidarity Party (PSI). He was previously Acting Chairman to cover for Grace Natalie while she pursued her master's degree.

Biography
Giring Ganesha Djumaryo was born in Jakarta on 14 July 1983 he is a Muslim. His father is Djumaryo Imam Muhni. Giring became interested in Britpop when he was in school.

In 2002, he was a founding member of the band Nidji (the name an adaptation of  [niji], the Japanese word for rainbow) together with Muhammad Ramadista Akbar (Rama), Ariel, Muhammad Andro Regantoro (Andro) and Muhammad Adri Prakarsa (Adri). They released their first album, Breakthru', in 2006. Their second album, Top Up, followed in 2007.

In 2008, he and his bandmates wrote "Laskar Pelangi" ("Rainbow Warriors"), the title track for the film Laskar Pelangi, while in Makassar for a concert. He later told Rolling Stone Indonesia that as soon as he had finished reading Andrea Hirata's original book — the source material for the film — he knew he would write the song. Giring went on the hajj with his mother in late 2008/early 2009. That same year, Giring appeared in the music video for Chrisye's posthumous single "Lirih" ("Gentle Voice").

In 2009, Ganesha and Nidji released their third album, Let's Play. The album included a song written for Chintya Riza, at the time Ganesha's girlfriend, entitled "Dosakah Aku" ("Am I Sinning"). In the same year, he provided a voice for the animated film Paddle Pop Kombatei the Movie, a tie-in for the Paddle Pop ice cream marketed in Indonesia by Wall's. In an interview with Tempo magazine, he said he was nervous when providing the dubbing.

He played the role of Sudja, a student of Ahmad Dahlan, in Hanung Bramantyo's biopic Sang Pencerah (The Enlightener) in 2010; it was his first acting role. For the role, he worked out at a gym and ate less to lose ; he said it was because there were very few large Indonesians during the Dutch colonisation of Indonesia. Giring also wrote a song for the film, titled "Allah Maha Suci" ("Allah, the All-Pure"), over a period of two days.

On 22 November 2011, Giring, Agnes Monica and Afgan Syahreza sang the song "Kita Bisa" ("We Can") at the closing ceremony of the Southeast Asian Games in Palembang, South Sumatra.

Legacy
Rolling Stone Indonesia ranked "Laskar Pelangi" 134th on its list of the best Indonesian songs of all time. In his review, Hasief Ardiasyah wrote that it was difficult to believe the song had been written without divine intervention.

Personal life
In July 2010, Giring Ganesh married Chintya Riza, six years his junior, in a Javanese style ceremony. The couple had their first daughter in January 2011. He cites Chris Martin of Coldplay as one of his inspirations and favourite performers.

References
Footnotes

Bibliography

External links
Giring Ganesha on Giring.ID

1983 births
Living people
21st-century Indonesian male singers
People from Jakarta
Indonesian Solidarity Party politicians
Indonesian Muslims
Minangkabau people
Javanese people